The Marudhar Express is an Express train belonging to North Western Railway zone that runs between  and  in India. It is currently being operated with 14865/14866 train numbers on a weekly basis.

Service

The 14866/Marudhar Express has an average speed of 49 km/hr and covers 1,179 km in 23 hours 45 mins. 14865/Marudhar Express has an average speed of 50 km/hr and covers 1,179 km in 23 hours 35 mins.

Route and halts 

The important halts of the train are:

Coach composition

The train has standard ICF rakes with max speed of 110 kmph. The train consists of 21 coaches:

 2 AC II Tier
 3 AC III Tier
 11 Sleeper coaches
 5 General
 2 Generators cum Luggage/parcel van

Traction

Both trains are hauled by a Bhagat Ki Kothi Loco Shed-based WDP-4 locomotive hauls the train from Jodhpur up to Agra, handing over to a Ghaziabad Loco Shed-based WAP-4 or WAP-7 locomotive until Lucknow following which a Lucknow Loco Shed-based WDM-3A locomotive powers the train for the remainder of the journey and vice versa.

Rake sharing

The train shares its rake with:

 14854/14853 Marudhar Express
 14863/14864 Marudhar Express (via Sultanpur)

See also 

 Varanasi Junction railway station
 Jodhpur Junction railway station
 Marudhar Express
 Marudhar Express (via Sultanpur)

Notes

External links 

 14865/Marudhar Express (via Pratapgarh)
 14866/Marudhar Express (via Pratapgarh)

References 

Passenger trains originating from Varanasi
Transport in Jodhpur
Named passenger trains of India
Rail transport in Rajasthan